Paulo França (28 February 1952 – 2 April 2022) was a Brazilian politician. A member of the Brazilian Democratic Movement, he served in the Legislative Assembly of Santa Catarina from 2011 to 2015. He died of cancer in Blumenau on 2 April 2022 at the age of 70.

References

1952 births
2022 deaths 
Deaths from cancer in Santa Catarina (state)
21st-century Brazilian politicians
Brazilian Democratic Movement politicians
Members of the Legislative Assembly of Santa Catarina
Politicians from Curitiba